Muhannad Mustafa Al-Shanqeeti (born 12 March 1999) is a Saudi Arabian footballer who plays as defender for Pro League side Al-Ittihad.

Career
Al-Shanqeeti began his career at the youth team of hometown club Ohod. He made his debut for the first team during the 2016–17 season. He scored his first goal for the club on 10 March 2017, scoring in the 2–0 win against Al-Adalah. He made 9 appearances and scored once during the 2016–17 season, helping Ohod finish second and earn promotion to the Pro League. On 18 August 2017, Al-Shanqeeti made his Pro League debut for Ohod in the 2–0 defeat to Al-Batin.

On 22 November 2018, Al-Shanqeeti joined Al-Ittihad on a free transfer. On 30 June 2019, Al-Shanqeeti was chosen in the scholarship program to develop football talents established by the General Sports Authority in Saudi Arabia. On 28 December 2019, Al-Shanqeeti made his debut for Al-Ittihad in the 1–1 draw against Al-Fateh. On 5 May 2021, Al-Shanqeeti renewed his contract with Al-Ittihad until the 2023–24 season. On 18 March 2022, Al-Shanqeeti scored his first goal for the club in a 3–0 win against Al-Hazem. Following his impressive performances in the month of March, Al-Shanqeeti was awarded the Young Player of the Month award.

Career statistics

Club

Honours
Al-Ittihad
Saudi Super Cup: 2022

Saudi Arabia U19
 AFC U-19 Championship: 2018

Individual
 Saudi Professional League Young Player of the Month: March 2022

References

1999 births
Living people
People from Medina
Saudi Arabian footballers
Saudi Arabia youth international footballers
Saudi Arabia international footballers
Association football defenders
Saudi Professional League players
Saudi First Division League players
Ohod Club players
Ittihad FC players